is a 2013 Japanese police procedural film directed by Hiroshi Nishitani.

Cast
 Masaharu Fukuyama as Manabu Yukawa
 Yuriko Yoshitaka as Misa Kishitani
 Kazuki Kitamura
 Anne Watanabe
 Gin Maeda
 Jun Fubuki

Reception
The film grossed  in Japan in 2013, becoming the year's 8th highest-grossing film in Japan, and the highest-grossing live-action Japanese film of the year in the country. Two days after opening in Hong Kong, it had earned 1.48 million (US$192,000), and it went on to gross US$701,465 in Hong Kong.

See also
Galileo (TV series)

References

2010s police procedural films
2013 films
Films based on Japanese novels
Films based on works by Keigo Higashino
Films directed by Hiroshi Nishitani
Films with screenplays by Yasushi Fukuda
Japanese crime films
2010s Japanese films